Sir Yazjan-e Galeh Zan Abu ol Hasan Beygi (also Romanized as Sīr Yazjān-e Galeh Zan Abū ol Ḩasan Beygī; also known as Sīr Yazjān) is a village in Khvajehei Rural District, Meymand District, Firuzabad County, Fars Province, Iran. At the 2006 census, its population was 79, in 13 families.

References 

Populated places in Firuzabad County